Gariamunda is a village of Pitamahul gram panchayat of Birmaharajpur subdivision, Subarnapur district, Odisha, India. It is located on the side of the road connecting Birmaharajpur and Rairakhol town.

References

External links 
 Orissa Government Portal

Villages in Subarnapur district